The Chamber of Princes (Narendra Mandal) was an institution established in 1920 by a royal proclamation of King-Emperor George V to provide a forum in which the rulers of the princely states of India could voice their needs and aspirations to the colonial government of British India. It survived until the end of the British Raj in 1947.

Overview 
The Chamber of Princes was established in 1920, by King-Emperor George V's proclamation on 23 December 1919, after the Government of India Act 1919 was given royal assent. The creation of the chamber followed the abandonment by the British of their long-established policy of isolating the Indian rulers from each other and also from the rest of the world.

The Chamber first met on 8 February 1921 and initially consisted of 120 members. Of those, 108 from the more significant states were members in their own right, while the remaining twelve seats were for the representation of a further 127 states. That left 327 minor states, which were unrepresented. Also, some of the more important rulers like the Maratha-ruled states of Baroda State, Gwalior State and Holkar State declined to join it .

The Chamber of Princes usually met only once a year, with the Viceroy of India presiding, but it appointed a Standing Committee which met more often. The full Chamber elected from its princely ranks a permanent officer styled the Chancellor, who chaired the Standing Committee.

The chamber convened at the Parliament House. Today the hall is used as the parliament's library.

Concerns about post-independence constitution 

On 12 March 1940, the Chamber resolved:

Chancellors

See also
 Durbar (court)
 List of Indian princely states
 Salute state

References

Further reading 
 S. M. Verma. . 
 
 R. P. Bhargava, The Chamber of Princes (Northern Book Centre, 1991, 351 pp.) 
 Barbara N. Ramusack, The Princes of India in the Twilight of Empire: Dissolution of a Patron-client System, 1914–1939 (Ohio State University Press, 1978)
 Ian Copland, Princes of India in the Endgame of Empire, 1917-1947 (Cambridge University Press, Cambridge Studies in Indian History & Society, 2002)

External links 

 Image of the chamber in session

1920 establishments in British India
1947 disestablishments in British India
Defunct upper houses
Historical legislatures in India
Legislatures of British India
Princely states of India